William Morton (21 April 1961 – 19 July 2019) was a Scottish cricketer who played with Warwickshire.

A slow left arm orthodox bowler, Morton made his first-class debut in 1982 for Scotland in a match against Ireland. He appeared two more times at first-class level for the Scots and his other 10 games were for Warwickshire.

References

External links
Cricket Europe

1961 births
2019 deaths
Cricketers from Stirling
Scottish cricket coaches
Scottish cricketers
Warwickshire cricketers